Saint-Éloy-les-Mines (Auvergnat: Sant Alòi de las Minas) is a commune in the Puy-de-Dôme department in Auvergne in central France.

Geography
The river Bouble flows north-northeastward through the commune.

Population

See also
Communes of the Puy-de-Dôme department
Saint Eloy's mines

References

Sainteloylesmines
Mining communities in France